Respaldiza or Arespalditza is a village and the seat of the municipality of Ayala/Aiara, in Álava province, Basque Country, Spain. As of 2017, it has a population of 507.

Notable people
Iñaki Isasi (born 1977), Professional cyclist.

References

Populated places in Álava